The Elite Basketball League (EBL) is a semi-professional men's basketball league that began play in the fall of 2014.

History 
There were 10 charter members competing in the first season, based around Arkansas. The EBL season begins in October and concludes with league playoffs in late April/early May. The first league championship (2014–15) was won by the Little Rock Diamonds, who defeated regular season winner Arkadelphia Bulldogs. The game was played on the campus of the University of Arkansas-Little Rock.

Season two began in October 2015 with nine teams, three (Arkansas Dream, Arkansas Golden Knights and Ridge City Rippers) new to the league. First season champion Little Rock Diamonds did not return along with Arkansas Premier and Spa City Outlaws. Arkadelphia Bulldogs left to help form a new league, the Elite International Basketball Association.

Bobby Johnson of Southwest Flight set a league-record by scoring 70 points in a game played on February 9, 2016 against the Golden Knights. Johnson bested the previous record of 61 points by Billy Berry of Arkansas Showstoppers.

Regular season winner Arkansas Elite went on to win the nine-team playoffs (best-of 3 series each round) to capture the 2016 championship. Elite defeated Southwest Flight in two-straight games.

Teams

Former teams
 Arkadelphia Bulldogs (2014–15)
 Arkansas Dream (2015)
 Arkansas Legends (2014–15)
 Arkansas Premier (2014–15)
 Arkansas Showstoppers (2014–15)
 Little Rock Diamonds (2014–15)
 Spa City Outlaws (2014–15)

Champions

References

External links 
 Official EBL website
 @EBLleague

Basketball leagues in the United States